David Slowinski is a mathematician involved in prime numbers. His career highlights have included the discovery of several of the largest known Mersenne primes:
 244497−1 (M27) (with H. L. Nelson) on April 8, 1979
 286243−1 (M28) on September 25, 1982
 2132049−1 (M30) on September 19, 1983
 2216091−1 (M31) on September 1, 1985
 2756839−1 (M32) (with P. Gage) on February 17, 1992
 2859433−1 (M33) (with P. Gage) on January 4, 1994
 21257787−1 (M34) (with P. Gage) on September 3, 1996
He has also written several textbooks on the subject.

Slowinski was a software engineer for Cray Research.

References

External links
 
 David Slowinski on Prime Wiki
 David Slowinski on The Prime Pages

Living people
20th-century American mathematicians
Cray employees
Number theorists
Year of birth missing (living people)